The North-south regional rapid railway is a railway construction plan in Budapest, modelled on the Paris RER or German S-Bahn systems. Its aim is to connect three of the Budapest Helyiérdekű Vasút (BHÉV) suburban train lines, from Szentendre, Ráckeve and Csepel. The plan is also called Metro 5.

History
In the '90s, the growth of the suburbs was not accompanied by public transportation. Population growth was especially strong in Buda and in Csepel island region, but the HÉV lines end at the boundaries of the downtown area, where passengers have to change to go into the city. Hence the idea was born to connect the HÉV lines underground. Lord Mayor Gábor Demszky first spoke of plans in 2002.

In 2005 the city council set aside a first 100 million forint for the project. The council proposed to implement the investment between 2007 and 2010 with European Union funding, but this was rejected. In 2007 deputy mayor Miklós Hagyó stated the council wanted to begin construction of the railway, and in February 2008, the Urban and Suburban Transport Association (VEKE) designed a four-track version of the metro line, now proposing to build the railway line from European Union sources between 2014 and 2020.

From 1 September 2019 the H5 suburban railway line was renamed line M5.

On 14 April 2021 test excavations began as part of preparations for the first section between Közvágóhíd and Kálvin tér.

Planning
The proposal is for a rapid rail system which will include the Budapest-Esztergom heavy railway line northward, and the Budapest-Kunszentmiklós line  southward.

The Csepel and Ráckeve HÉV lines will be connected on the surface, near the National Theatre. In Boráros Square, the metro goes underground, and at Kálvin Square it crosses Metro line 3 and line 4. At Astoria the line crosses line 2. The rail heads to Oktogon, and crosses line 1. Finally, at Lehel tér, the line again crosses Metro line 3 before heading to Margaret Island and Buda side.

Proposed stations
Metro line 5, Észak-déli Regionális Gyorsvasút (North-South Regional Rapid Railway; provisional name), is planned to be a suburban railways' connector line, meant to replace and connect the lines of the existing suburban railways between Szentendre (currently served by HÉV Line 5), Ráckeve (currently served by HÉV Line 6) and Csepel (currently served by HÉV Line 7). It will cross Budapest downtown, and provide connection for the railway stations in the city. It will probably have the following stations (except for the termini, only those within Budapest are included):

 Szentendre
 ...
 Békásmegyer
 Petőfi tér
 Csillaghegy
 Rómaifürdő
 Aquincum
 Záhony u.
 Kaszásdűlő
 Bogdáni út
 Flórián tér
 Amfiteátrum
 Szépvölgyi út
 Margitsziget
 Szent István park
 Lehel tér
 Oktogon
 Klauzál tér
 Astoria
 Kálvin tér
 Boráros tér
 Könyves Kálmán körút
 Beöthy u.
 Kén u.
 Timót u.
 Határ út
 Pesterzsébet – városközpont
 Nagysándor József u.
 Klapka Gy. u.
 Wesselényi u.  (or Akácfa u. instead of the latter two)
 Vörösmarty tér
 Könyves u.
 Tárcsás u.
 Soroksári vasútállomás
 BILK (logisztikai központ)
 ...
 Csepel, Ráckeve

Branching at Könyves u.:
 Soroksár felső
 Soroksár – Hősök tere
 Szent István u.
 Millennium-telep
 ...

See the map.

References

Budapest Metro
Proposed rail infrastructure in Hungary
Underground commuter rail